Clyde McIntosh (born 1958) is a retired British boxer and boxing trainer.

Boxing career
He represented England and won a bronze medal in the 63.5 kg light-welterweight division, at the 1982 Commonwealth Games in Brisbane, Queensland, Australia.

McIntosh boxed for the Bell Green ABC and was the ABA light-welterweight runner-up to Tony Adams in 1982.

References

1958 births
Living people
British male boxers
Commonwealth Games medallists in boxing
Boxers at the 1982 Commonwealth Games
Commonwealth Games bronze medallists for England
Light-welterweight boxers
Medallists at the 1982 Commonwealth Games